Mueang Krabi is the capital district (amphoe mueang) of Krabi province in southern Thailand.

Geography
Neighboring districts are (from the north clockwise): Ao Luek, Khao Phanom, and Nuea Khlong. To the south and west it borders Phang Nga Bay.

In the district is the Phi Phi Archipelago and several smaller islands. The karst landscape at the coast has attracts tourists to the beaches of Ao Nang and Railay, well-known to rock climbers.

Khao Phanom Bencha National Park in the north of the district protects the forests around Phanom Bencha, the highest elevation in Krabi Province. That hills are also the source of the Krabi River, which empties into Phang Nga Bay at Krabi town. Its estuary with mangrove forests and mudflats is a Ramsar-protected wetland.

Administration
The district is divided into 10 sub-districts (tambons), which are further subdivided into 66 villages (mubans). Krabi itself is the only town (thesaban mueang) of the district, covering tambons Pak Nam and Krabi Yai. The remaining tambons each have a tambon administrative organization (TAO).

The missing numbers 4, 7-10 and 12-14 were split off as Nuea Khlong district

External links
amphoe.com

Districts of Krabi province